Leslie Hubricht (born 11 January 1908 in Los Angeles, California, died 16 September 2005 in Meridian, Mississippi) was an American biologist and malacologist.

If he had lived in a previous century, Hubricht would have been called a "gentleman naturalist". His formal education ended after one semester of high school; his informal education lasted his lifetime.

Professionally, Leslie Hubricht worked as an assistant at the Missouri Botanical Gardens from 1936 to 1943, then, until 1973, he was employed by Remington Rand as a tabulating machine mechanic and as a UNIVAC repairman. Much of his time, however, was devoted to one or another aspect of natural history, including plants, cave life, and amphipods and isopods.

He was especially devoted to the study of the terrestrial mollusks of the eastern United States, a field in which he was termed a "world authority" by Alan Solem (then Curator of Invertebrates at the Field Museum of Natural History in Chicago). The museum's purchase of his collection in 1990 was instrumental in its development of a world-class terrestrial mollusk collection.

Hubricht had 3 kinds of plants and 26 kinds of animals named in his honor. Hubricht himself named 81 kinds of land snails from the eastern United States. His list of scientific publications contains 147 entries.

Selected publications
 Hubricht L. & Mackin J.G. 1940. Descriptions of 9 new species of freshwater amphipod crustaceans, with notes and new localities for other species. American Midland Naturalist, 23: 187–218.
 Hubricht L. & Ralph O. Erickson. 1941. Another method for recording localities from topographical maps. Science 93(2412): 288.
 Pilsbry, H. A. & Hubricht L. 1956. Beach drift Polygyridae from southern Texas. Nautilus 69: 93–96.
 Hubricht L. 1964. Land Snails from the Caves of Kentucky, Tennessee and Alabama. Bulletin of the National Speleological Society. 26(1): 33–36.
 Hubricht L. 1985. The distributions of the native land mollusks of the Eastern United States. Fieldiana: Zoology New Ser: 24. 191 pp.

References

1908 births
2005 deaths
American malacologists
Missouri Botanical Garden people
20th-century American biologists
Scientists from Los Angeles
20th-century American zoologists